The 1979 Missouri Tigers football team was an American football team that represented the University of Missouri in the Big Eight Conference (Big 8) during the 1979 NCAA Division I-A football season. The team compiled a 7–5 record (3–4 against Big 8 opponents), finished in fourth place in the Big 8, and was outscored by opponents by a combined total of 260 to 166. Warren Powers was the head coach for the second of seven seasons. The team played its home games at Faurot Field in Columbia, Missouri.

The team's statistical leaders included James Wilder with 645 rushing yards, Phil Bradley with 1,448 passing yards and 1,764 yards of total offense, Andy Gibler with 316 receiving yards, and Gerry Ellis with 54 points scored.

Schedule

Personnel

References

Missouri
Missouri Tigers football seasons
All-American Bowl champion seasons
Missouri Tigers football